Timothy Cornelius Donahue (June 8, 1870 – June 12, 1902) was a catcher in Major League Baseball.

Sources

1870 births
1902 deaths
Boston Reds (AA) players
Chicago Colts players
Chicago Orphans players
Washington Senators (1901–1960) players
19th-century baseball players
Major League Baseball catchers
Baseball players from Massachusetts
Lewiston (minor league baseball) players
Dover (minor league baseball) players
Kansas City Cowboys (minor league) players
Colorado Springs Millionaires players
People from Raynham, Massachusetts